Rik Mulders (born 6 August 2000) is a Dutch professional footballer who plays as a right-back for Eerste Divisie club FC Den Bosch.

Club career
Mulders started his career at FC Den Bosch and played for Jong FC Den Bosch prior to making his debut for the club on 23 August 2019 in a 1–1 draw at home to FC Eindhoven.
Mulders signed his professional contract with FC Den Bosch in June 2020, lasting until the summer of 2022.

Career statistics

References

External links
 Career stats & Profile - Voetbal International

Living people
2000 births
Dutch footballers
Association football midfielders
FC Den Bosch players
Eerste Divisie players
Footballers from Friesland